

D

E

F 

D